The 2014 Macau Open Grand Prix Open was the eighteenth tournament of the 2014 BWF Grand Prix Gold and Grand Prix circuit. The tournament was held in Tap Seac Multi-sports Pavilion, Macau November 25–30, 2014 and had a total purse of $120,000.

Players by nation

Men's singles

Seeds

  Srikanth Kidambi (withdrew)
  Marc Zwiebler (quarter-final)
  Prannoy Kumar (semi-final)
  Hsu Jen-hao (third round)
  Rajiv Ouseph (quarter-final)
  Wong Wing Ki (final)
  Sourabh Varma (second round)
  Sai Praneeth (third round)
  Gao Huan (third round)
  Vladimir Malkov (first round)
  Xue Song (champion)
  Mohd Arif Abdul Latif (second round)
  Sony Dwi Kuncoro (quarter-final)
  Ajay Jayaram (first round)
  Tan Chun Seang (first round)
  Zulfadli Zulkiffli (third round)

Finals

Top half

Section 1

Section 2

Section 3

Section 4

Bottom half

Section 5

Section 6

Section 7

Section 8

Women's singles

Seeds

  Carolina Marín (withdrew)
  Pusarla Venkata Sindhu (champion)
  Michelle Li (quarter-final)
  Zhang Beiwen (quarter-final)
  Han Li (quarter-final)
  Nichaon Jindapon (second round)
  Sun Yu (semi-final)
  Busanan Ongbumrungpan (semi-final)

Finals

Top half

Section 1

Section 2

Bottom half

Section 3

Section 4

Men's doubles

Seeds

  Li Junhui / Liu Yuchen (first round)
  Danny Bawa Chrisnanta / Chayut Triyachart (champion)
  Łukasz Moren / Wojciech Skudlarczyk (first round)
  Wahyu Nayaka / Ade Yusuf (semi-final)
  Wang Yilu / Zhang Wen (quarter-final)
  Berry Angriawan / Ryan Agung Saputro (second round)
  Angga Pratama / Ricky Karanda Suwardi (final)
  Fran Kurniawan / Agripinna Prima Rahmanto Putra (first round)

Finals

Top half

Section 1

Section 2

Bottom half

Section 3

Section 4

Women's doubles

Seeds

  Luo Ying / Luo Yu (first round)
  Duanganong Aroonkesorn / Kunchala Voravichitchaikul (semi-final)
  Vivian Hoo Kah Mun / Woon Khe Wei (semi-final)
  Suci Rizki Andini / Tiara Rosalia Nuraidah (quarter-final)
  Keshya Nurvita Hanadia / Devi Tika Permatasari (quarter-final)
  Huang Yaqiong / Zhong Qianxin (final)
  Choi Hye-in / Ko A-ra (quarter-final)
  Chan Tsz Ka / Tse Ying Suet (first round)

Finals

Top half

Section 1

Section 2

Bottom half

Section 3

Section 4

Mixed doubles

Seeds

  Lu Kai / Huang Yaqiong (first round)
  Praveen Jordan / Debby Susanto (withdrew)
  Danny Bawa Chrisnanta / Vanessa Neo Yu Yan (final)
  Chan Yun Lung / Tse Ying Suet (second round)
  Huang Kaixiang / Huang Dongping (semi-final)
  Ronald Alexander / Melati Daeva Oktaviani (second round)
  Edi Subaktiar / Gloria Emanuelle Widjaja (champion)
  Akshay Dewalkar / Pradnya Gadre (withdrew)

Finals

Top half

Section 1

Section 2

Bottom half

Section 3

Section 4

References

Macau Open Badminton Championships
Macau Open
Open Grand Prix Gold
Macau Open Grand Prix Gold